Kakkeri is a village in yadgir district in Karnataka, India.

References

Villages in Belagavi district